Olga Viktorovna Ivanova (born 6 January 1979) is a Russian shot putter. Her personal best throw is 19.48 metres, achieved in July 2008 in Tula.

She finished seventh at the 2005 European Indoor Championships and seventh at the 2008 Olympic Games. She also competed at the 2005 World Championships and the 2006 World Indoor Championships without reaching the final round.

Initially fifth at the 2010 European Championships, she won the bronze medal after two disqualifications for doping of Nadzeya Ostapchuk and Natallia Mikhnevich.

Achievements

References

1979 births
Living people
Russian female shot putters
Athletes (track and field) at the 2008 Summer Olympics
Olympic athletes of Russia
21st-century Russian women